Island Etude is a 2006 Taiwanese film directed by Chen Hwai-en. It was Taiwan's submission to the 80th Academy Awards for the Academy Award for Best Foreign Language Film, but was not accepted as a nominee.

Plot
A film about a hearing impaired college student who grabs his bike, backpack, and guitar and goes on a 7-day, 6-night 
round-the-island tour. On the way he discovers the natural and cultural beauty of Taiwan and during his encounters with different people he is exposed to local arts, folk customs, approaches to environmental protection, traditional family values, and a host of other cultural enlightenments.

Cast
Tung Ming-hsiang as Ming
Teng An-ning as film director
Yuen-lun as Canadian biker
Chen Hsiu-hui as Canadian biker's mother
Ruta Palionyte as Lithuanian model
Yang Li-yin as Teacher Liu
Wu Nien-jen as Your Guide Wu

See also

Cinema of Taiwan
List of submissions to the 80th Academy Awards for Best Foreign Language Film
List of films featuring the deaf and hard of hearing

References

External links

2006 films
2000s road movies
Taiwanese drama films
2006 directorial debut films